Andale may refer to:

Andalé Mono, a monospaced sans-serif typeface
Andalé Sans, a proportional sans-serif typeface
Andale, Kansas
Andale, Virginia, a location in Fallout 3, based on Annandale, Virginia

See also